Eagle Point is a small town in Victoria, Australia within the Shire of East Gippsland on the Gippsland lakes, mostly on Lake King. The area encompasses the red limestone cliffs by the Mitchell River and Mitchell River silt jetties. It is a popular tourist destination.

History
The Gunai name for Eagle Point is Nurrung, which translates to moon.

Eagle Point is a place associated with the Bushy Park massacres of local Gunai Aboriginal people. In 1840-41, Angus McMillan and his men killed an unknown number of Gunai people in skirmishes during "the defence of Bushy Park". In the mid to late 1840s, Eagle Point was the headquarters for the Border Police under Commissioner Tyers. In conjunction with the Native Police force based at nearby Boisdale, this force conducted regular punitive raids upon Gunai camps across the region.

Demographics
The Australian Bureau of Statistics 2016 Census found the town has a ratio of 51 males to 49 females. The median age is 56 years of age, 18 years above the Australian average. At 79.2%, the majority of people living in Eagle Point were born in Australia. The other top responses for country of birth were England, Germany, New Zealand, Netherlands and Scotland. In Eagle Point, 90.1% of people only spoke English at home. Italian speakers number 0.8%, 0.7% speak German, while Afrikaans, Finnish and Malay speakers each number 0.3%.

63.1%, of the town are religious and 19.4% are Anglican, 15.8% are Catholic and 4.8% belong to the Uniting Church. 36.9% of the population were reported as having no religion.

59.1% of the population are married. and 19.4% have never married, 11.9% are divorced, 6.0% are widowed and 3.6% are separated. 
 
51.0% of people living in Eagle Point are employed full-time, and 35.3% are working part-time. Eagle Point has an unemployment rate of 4.0%.

Education

Eagle Point is served by a primary school, Eagle Point Primary School, founded in 1894. It is situated on School Road and Eagle Point Rd. In 2010 it completed a redevelopment which included 2 new buildings.

Tourism
Eagle Point is known for its tourism. It has two caravan parks, Eagle Point Caravan Park and Lake King Caravan Park. In fact some people refer to Eagle Point Caravan Park as just Eagle Point. Eagle Point's main attraction is the reserve. There are also kangaroos regularly in sight on silt jetties. The other attraction is Lake King or The Mitchell River but Lake King is sometimes closed off to the public due to algae blooms. There are also beachfront apartments available for rent. Bairnsdale Riviera Triathlon Club hosts an annual event in Eagle Point each summer.

Arts & Culture
Although there are no art galleries in Eagle Point, the town has a small number of professional artists living and working in the area.

References

Towns in Victoria (Australia)
Shire of East Gippsland